Carolyn Marie Sinton (born 23 January 1938) is a New Zealand former cricketer who played as a right-handed batter. She appeared in one Test match for New Zealand in 1957. She played domestic cricket for Auckland.

References

External links
 
 

1938 births
Living people
Cricketers from Auckland
New Zealand women cricketers
New Zealand women Test cricketers
Auckland Hearts cricketers